Thomas Francis O'Higgins (20 November 1890 – 1 November 1953) was an Irish Fine Gael politician and medical practitioner who served as Minister for Defence from 1948 to 1951, Minister for Industry and Commerce from March 1951 to June 1951 and Leader of the Opposition from January 1944 to June 1944. He served as a Teachta Dála (TD) from 1929 to 1932 and 1937 to 1953.

Following the killing of his father and his brother during the Irish Civil War in the 1920s, he became politically radicalised and joined Cumann na nGaedhael, as well as also briefly becoming the leader of the Blueshirts.

Background
O'Higgins grew up in Stradbally, County Laois, the second son of sixteen children (eight boys, eight girls) of Dr. Thomas Higgins and Anne Sullivan. His mother was the daughter of Timothy Daniel Sullivan, an Irish nationalist, journalist, politician and poet. His father's first cousin, Tim Healy, was one of the most well known Irish MPs in the British House of Commons in the late 19th century and later the first Governor-General of the Irish Free State. Thomas grew up alongside his younger brother Kevin O'Higgins, the fourth son of his parents.

O'Higgins was educated at Presentation Convent, Stradbally, the Christian Brothers’ schools in Maryborough (now Portlaoise), and Clongowes Wood College in County Kildare before studying medicine at University College Dublin. He qualified as a medical doctor in 1914. It was while practising as a Doctor in Fontstown, County Kildare, in the late 1910s, that he became a local organiser for both Sinn Féin and the Irish Volunteers. In 1919, he was imprisoned twice; first, he was sent to in Mountjoy Prison, Dublin, and then the Curragh Camp, County Kildare, for soliciting subscriptions to the first Dáil Éireann loan.

O'Higgins status continued to grow; he became a Town Commissioner for Portlaoise in 1920, and was later arrested again for leading the people of Portlaoise in a protest after the death of Terence MacSwiney. As a result, he was sent to Abercorn Barracks in County Down, during which time his home back in Portlaoise was turned into an Officers' Mess for the Black and Tans after they evicted his wife and children.

It was in 1921, he added the prefix "O" to his surname, a common trend at the time, particularly amongst those involved in the Gaelic League. Those adding O to their surnames believed they were simply restoring what had been previously removed during Anglicisation in previous generations.

Military career
O'Higgins supported the Anglo-Irish Treaty and enlisted in the National Army of the Irish Free State in 1922 during the Irish Civil War. There he was appointed captain in the medical corps, and subsequently became Medical Corps Deputy Commander and Director of Medical Services with the rank of colonel.

The killing of his father and his brother

On 11 February 1923, his father was killed by the Anti-Treaty IRA during a raid on his fathers' home. On 10 July 1927, his brother Kevin O'Higgins, at this point the Cumann na nGaedhael Minister for Justice, was assassinated by the IRA. During the Civil War Kevin, as Minister for Justice, had brought in severe measures to crack down on the IRA, including the introduction of the death penalty. Kevin confirmed the death sentences of 77 captured Republicans, including that of Rory O'Connor, who had been the best man at Kevin's wedding. Both the deaths of Thomas Senior and Kevin were believed to have been in retaliation for those death sentences.

Political career
O'Higgins resigned his army commission to stand as a Cumann na nGaedheal candidate for Dublin North at the 14 March 1929 by-election. It was there he won a narrow victory over Fianna Fáil's Oscar Traynor.

At the 1932 general election, he switched constituencies and this time stood for Leix–Offaly, he was elected again. This was the beginning of a sixteen-year stint as a TD for Laois–Offaly.

With the Blueshirts
The political atmosphere of the early 1930s in Ireland was becoming increasingly divisive. The 1920s had seen the Labour Party as the main opposition in the Dáil but in 1927 Fianna Fáil dropped their abstentionism and entered the chamber, becoming the main opposition, and were much more vocally opposed to Cumann na nGaedhael than Labour had been. Fianna Fáil had been pressured to drop their abstentionism partially after Kevin O'Higgins as Minister for Justice brought forward a law that requiring all political candidates to swear that they would take the Oath of Allegiance if elected to the Dáil. Fianna Fáil eventually agreed to do so after dismissing the Oath as an "Empty formula". The onset of the Great Depression further increased tensions as the economy tanked.

It was the midset of this that Fianna Fáil won the 1932 general election. Upon entry into government, Fianna Fáil set about releasing many of the political prisoners arrested by Cumann na nGaedhael in the preceding years. As a result, many members of the IRA were freed. The IRA and many released prisoners, who held Cumann na nGaedhael in contempt, began a "campaign of unrelenting hostility" against those associated with the former Cumann na nGaedheal government. Frank Ryan, one of the most prominent socialists in 1930s Ireland, active in the IRA and Republican Congress, declared "as long as we have fists and boots, there will be no free speech for traitors". As a consequence, many Cumann na nGaedhael public meeting began to be disrupted by IRA members.

In response, former members of the National Army and supporters of the Cumann na nGaedhael party formed the Army Comrades Association (ACA), better known as the Blueshirts. The organisation began acting as stewards at Cumann na nGaedhael meetings and began engaging in street fighting with IRA members. In August 1932, O'Higgins was invited to become the leader of the ACA, which he accepted. O'Higgins was joined in the organisation by fellow Cumann na nGaedhael TDs Ernest Blythe, Patrick McGilligan and Desmond Fitzgerald. It was under O'Higgins direction that the ACA went from an association of ex-National Army members into a crusading right-wing movement hitched to Cumann na nGaedhael. O'Higgins asked ACA members to defend the right to free speech and assembly against "Republican thuggery", and to defend Christian values against "Communist influences" he suggested were entering Ireland via the IRA.

In 1933, Fianna Fáil called a surprise election which saw them consolidate their power in the Dáil. That spring, O'Higgins handed over leadership of the ACA to Eoin O'Duffy, the former Garda Commissioner who had just been sacked by Éamon de Valera. O'Duffy took the ACA into a more radically hardline direction, renaming it the "National Guard" and adopting many elements of European Fascism such as the Roman straight-arm salute, uniforms and huge public rallies.

In August 1933, Fianna Fáil banned the National Guard following an aborted march on Dublin. As a result, in September the National Guard, the National Centre Party and Cumann na nGaedhael merged into one new party, Fine Gael. O'Duffy was named leader, with WT Cosgrave of CnaG replaced to avoid the idea that the new party was merely a continuation of CnaG. The National Guard, now known as the Young Ireland Association, was to act as a youth wing for the party. O'Higgins was key in battering the new alliance. Representing the National Guard in the negotiation phase, he became part of Fine Gael's first national executive and sat on its Dáil front bench.

In September 1933, the Gardai raided the National Guard's Dublin headquarters. In response, O'Higgins and Desmond FitzGerald led other Fine Gael TDs in wearing the blue shirt of the National Guard in the Dáil chamber. In February 1934, at Fine Gael's first national convention, O'Higgins denounced Fianna Fáil as ‘the vanguard of the communist policy here’, and called Éamon de Valera an ‘arch-communist agent’. O'Higgins was amongst the Fine Gael leaders more open to the introduction of Corporatism policies being pushed by members of the Blueshirts such as James Hogan, Michael Tierney and Ernest Blythe.

In Fine Gael
O'Duffy lasted only a year as leader before being replaced by Cosgrave. O'Higgins was made vice-president of the party and in October 1936 reorganised the Blueshirts, abolishing their status as a semi-independent grouping within Fine Gael and made their officers directly responsible to the party's standing committee. It marked the general trend of winding down the Blueshirts and merging them into the mainstream of the party.

During World War II, O'Higgins defended the right of James Dillon to speak out against the party's stance of supporting Irish neutrality alongside Fianna Fáil. Dillon wished to see Ireland join the Allies against the Axis powers.

He became parliamentary leader of Fine Gael in 1944, while the former leader, Richard Mulcahy, was attempting to get elected to Seanad Éireann and retain his position.

Return to government
During the 1948 general election, O'Higgins left the Laois–Offaly constituency in order to allow his son Tom O'Higgins to successful stand there. O'Higgins stood for Cork Borough instead. In the same election, O'Higgins' other son Michael O'Higgins was also elected for Dublin South-West.

In 1948, he joined the government of John A. Costello as Minister for Defence. He served as Minister for Industry and Commerce from March 1951 to June 1951.

O'Higgins died while still in office in 1953. On 3 March 1954, Stephen Barrett of Fine Gael won the by-election for the vacant seat.

Personal life
On 17 October 1915, O'Higgins married Agnes McCarthy of Cork. They had four sons and one daughter together.

See also
Families in the Oireachtas
Auditors of the Literary and Historical Society (University College Dublin)

References

 

1890 births
1953 deaths
Alumni of University College Dublin
Cumann na nGaedheal TDs
Fine Gael TDs
Irish anti-communists
20th-century Irish medical doctors
Members of the 6th Dáil
Members of the 7th Dáil
Members of the 8th Dáil
Members of the 9th Dáil
Members of the 10th Dáil
Members of the 11th Dáil
Members of the 12th Dáil
Members of the 13th Dáil
Members of the 14th Dáil
Members of the Blueshirts
Ministers for Defence (Ireland)
National Army (Ireland) officers
Ministers for Enterprise, Trade and Employment
People educated at Clongowes Wood College